General John Ernest Dahlquist (March 12, 1896 – July 30, 1975) was a senior United States Army officer. In the course of his military career, Dahlquist commanded three different army divisions, commanded at the corps and field army level and rose to the rank of four-star general. He is well-known for commanding the series of poor tactical decisions which led to the 442nd RCT becoming the most highly decorated unit in the history of the United States Armed Forces.

Early life and military career
Born on March 12, 1896, in Minneapolis, Minnesota, the youngest of four children, Dahlquist's parents were immigrants from Dalsland, Sweden. He graduated from the University of Minnesota and received a direct commission as a second lieutenant into the Infantry Branch of the United States Army in August 1917, shortly after the American entry into World War I on April 6, 1917. Unable to serve overseas, he served in the Allied occupation of the Rhineland after the war.

Remaining in the army during the interwar period he returned to the United States and served as an instructor at the U.S. Army Infantry School from 1924 to 1928. After graduating from the U.S. Army Command and General Staff School in 1931, he was assigned to the Philippines. From 1935 to 1936 he was a student at the U.S. Army War College, serving on the U.S. Army General Staff, Personnel Division after graduation.

World War II
With the American entry into World War II in December 1941, Dahlquist was sent to England and assigned as deputy chief of staff to Major General Dwight David Eisenhower in early 1942, and, later that year, with the one-star rank of brigadier general, became the assistant division commander (ADC) of the 76th Infantry Division. In June 1943, promoted to the two-star rank of major general, Dahlquist became the first commanding general (CG) of the 70th Infantry Division, becoming one of the youngest division commanders in the U.S. Army. In July 1944, he took command of the 36th Infantry Division, a National Guard formation from Texas that had fought in many difficult battles in the Italian Campaign under Major General Frederick Walker and had recently taken part in Operation Dragoon, the Allied invasion of Southern France. It was during this period that saw Dahlquist receive the first of two Army Distinguished Service Medals. The citation for the first Army DSM reads:

Dahlquist was criticized for his overuse of the Japanese-American 442nd Regimental Combat Team (442nd RCT), which had been attached to his 36th Division. Many believed his poor decisions led to the 442nd RCT becoming the most highly decorated unit in the history of the United States Armed Forces. Over a third of the men in the 442nd were either killed or wounded when Dahlquist ordered the unit to rescue another unit that had been surrounded by the enemy. It is not the surviving Nisei soldiers of the 442nd but their officers (none of them Japanese-American) who are most often quoted in criticism of Dahlquist.

On October 24, 1944, the 1st and 2nd Battalions of the 141st Infantry Regiment, part of Dahlquist's 36th Division, moved to secure the right flank of the 3rd Division near the French town of St-Die. When the German forces counterattacked, the 1st Battalion was separated and cut off. After two days of attempted rescue by the other two battalions of the 141st Infantry, Dahlquist sent in the 442nd RCT, which had borne the brunt of the 36th Division's fighting for the previous eight days. The 442nd would suffer 800 casualties, including 121 dead, during the five days it took to rescue 211 men of the 1st Battalion, 141st Infantry. Major General Lucian Truscott, commanding the VI Corps (under which unit the 36th Division was serving), considered relieving him of his command.

Dahlquist continued to lead the 36th Division throughout the campaign in Western Europe. On May 8, 1945, Victory in Europe Day, Hermann Göring surrendered to Brigadier General Robert I. Stack, the 36th Infantry Division's assistant division commander (ADC), after a ceasefire was declared between the German Army Group G and the U.S. Seventh Army. Stack transported Göring to the division command post. Because he spoke German, Dahlquist dismissed his translator, and so it was Dahlquist who became the first person to question Göring. Press photos of Dahlquist and Stack, in seemingly casual conversation with Göring, were released for publication in the United States and resulted in criticism of Dahlquist from the American public and from General Eisenhower, the Supreme Allied Commander in the European Theater of Operations (ETO).

Postwar

Following the war, Dahlquist returned to the United States, serving in various administrative and personnel jobs. He took command of his third division, the 1st Infantry, in 1949. This was followed by command of V Corps from 1952 to 1953 and the Fourth Army in 1953. He then served as Chief of Army Field Forces from 1953 to 1955, during which he was promoted to the four-star rank of general on August 18, 1954. He finished his career as Commander-in-Chief, Continental Army Command, retiring in 1956, and receiving his second Army DSM for his services during a two-and-a-half year period, with the medal's citation reading:

Dahlquist died on June 30, 1975, aged 79, and was buried in Arlington National Cemetery, Virginia.

Marriage
Dahlquist was married to Ruth D. Dahlquist, who was born 17 days after him and died 17 days after him. She was buried with him at Arlington National Cemetery. They had a son, Donald John Dahlquist, born on March 9, 1932, who died on November 22, 1993, and was buried in Arlington next to his parents. Dahlquist had two grandchildren, John William and Donette Ruth.

Awards and decorations
Dahlquist's awards and decorations include the Distinguished Service Cross, the Army Distinguished Service Medal, the Silver Star, the Legion of Merit and the Bronze Star. In 1954, he received an honorary Master of Arts from the University of Minnesota.
   Distinguished Service Cross
   Army Distinguished Service Medal
   Silver Star
   Legion of Merit
   Bronze Star
 World War I Victory Medal
 Army of Occupation of Germany Medal
 American Defense Service Medal
 American Campaign Medal
 European-African-Middle Eastern Campaign Medal
 World War II Victory Medal
 Army of Occupation Medal
 National Defense Service Medal

See also
 Lost Battalion (World War II)

References

Bibliography

 Alford, Kenneth D. Nazi Plunder: Great Treasure Stories of World War II. [New York]: Da Capo Press, 2003. 
 Sterner, C. Douglas. Go for Broke: The Nisei Warriors of World War II Who Conquered Germany, Japan, and American Bigotry. Clearfield, Utah: American Legacy Historical Press, 2008.

External links
Generals of World War II

|-

|-

|-

|-

1896 births
United States Army Infantry Branch personnel
1975 deaths
Recipients of the Distinguished Service Cross (United States)
Recipients of the Distinguished Service Medal (US Army)
Recipients of the Silver Star
Recipients of the Legion of Merit
Burials at Arlington National Cemetery
Military personnel from Minneapolis
University of Minnesota alumni
American people of Swedish descent
United States Army Command and General Staff College alumni
Air Corps Tactical School alumni
United States Army personnel of World War I
United States Army generals of World War II
United States Army generals